Lewis McCormick Field is a baseball stadium in Asheville, North Carolina. It is the home field of the Asheville Tourists team of Minor League Baseball. As befits the hilly city of Asheville, the ballpark sits on a section of level ground partway up one of the city's hills, providing a picturesque atmosphere. It is the third-oldest ballpark in Minor League Baseball.

History

The ballpark was built in 1924 and was named after Asheville resident Lewis McCormick. Lights were installed for nighttime play prior to the 1930 season. Since then, it has been home to the various incarnations of the Asheville Tourists team, and also served as home field for the Asheville Blues of the Negro Southern League during the 1940s. The facility was renovated in 1959, and then rebuilt in concrete between the 1991 and 1992 seasons, replacing the largely wood structure which had developed a leaky roof. The 1992 ballpark kept a similar layout to the original McCormick Field. The facility included new expanded restrooms and larger concession stands. New clubhouses were built and lights erected as player and field enhancements.

It is one of the oldest Minor League Baseball stadiums still in regular use; as of the 2021 season, only Jackie Robinson Ballpark and LECOM Park, both in Florida, are older, dating to 1914 and 1923, respectively.

Other uses
The ballpark served as one of the settings for the 1988 film Bull Durham.

The venue hosted the 2009 Big South Conference baseball tournament, won by Coastal Carolina.

Farther up the hill, behind the left field area, is Asheville Memorial Stadium, a football and soccer facility. Its bleacher seating structure is visible from McCormick Field.

See also
 List of NCAA Division I baseball venues

References

External links
Photos of the ballpark
McCormick Field Views – Ball Parks of the Minor Leagues
Sanborn map showing Oates Park, immediate predecessor to McCormick Field, in 1917
Map showing artist's conception of Riverside Park, predecessor to Oates Park, near lower left corner, in 1912
More about Riverside Park

Minor league baseball venues
Sports venues in North Carolina
UNC Asheville Bulldogs baseball
Baseball venues in North Carolina
Negro league baseball venues
Negro league baseball venues still standing
Buildings and structures in Asheville, North Carolina
Tourist attractions in Asheville, North Carolina
1924 establishments in North Carolina
Sports venues completed in 1924
College baseball venues in the United States
South Atlantic League ballparks